Eiffel Bridge can refer to:

 Eiffel Bridge, Láchar, a bridge in Spain
 Eiffel Bridge, Ungheni, a railway bridge in Ungheni, Moldova
 Eiffel Bridge, Tsagveri, a railway bridge in Tsagveri, Georgia
 Eiffel Bridge, Zrenjanin, a bridge in Zrenjanin, Serbia
 Tour Eiffel Bridge (Eiffel Tower Bridge; Eiffel Bridge), Gatineau, Quebec, Canada
 Ponte Eiffel, Viana do Castelo, Portugal

 Maria Pia Bridge, a bridge in Porto, Portugal; designed by Gustave Eiffel
 Garabit viaduct, a rail bridge in Southern France; constructed by Gustave Eiffel

See also

 Eiffel (disambiguation)